Randal "Thrill" Hill (born September 21, 1969) is a former American football wide receiver and politician. He played in the National Football League from 1991 through 1997 for the Miami Dolphins, Phoenix / Arizona Cardinals, and New Orleans Saints.

Football career
Hill graduated from Miami Killian High School in Kendall, Florida, where he played for the school's American football team as a cornerback. He attended the University of Miami, and played college football for the Miami Hurricanes football team. At Miami, he became a wide receiver. In his Hurricanes' career, Hill had 107 receptions for 1,643 yards with 11 touchdowns, and returned 54 kickoffs for an average of 21.6 yards per return.

The Miami Dolphins selected Hill in the first round, with the 23rd overall selection, of the 1991 NFL Draft. Hill missed four weeks of training camp in a contract dispute, before he signed with the Dolphins, reportedly for $2 million. After the first game of the 1991 season, with Dolphins coach Don Shula believing that Hill was not ready to play, the Dolphins traded Hill to the Phoenix Cardinals for a first round pick in the 1992 NFL Draft. Hill caught 58 passes for 861 yards and three touchdowns in 1991, had 43 receptions for 495 yards in 1992, and recorded 35 receptions for 519 yards with four touchdowns in 1993. He played with the Cardinals through the 1994 season, and then returned to Miami for the 1995 and 1996 seasons. He spent the 1997 season with the New Orleans Saints. He led the Saints with 55 receptions for 761 yards. He signed with the Chicago Bears for the 1998 season, but did not make the team.

Hill was interviewed about his time at the University of Miami for the documentary The U, which premiered December 12, 2009 on ESPN.

Career after football
After his football career ended, Hill worked for the Sunrise, Florida, police department and the Palm Beach County Sheriff's Office. He then became an agent for United States Customs.

In July 2015, Hill declared that he would run in the Democratic Party primary election against incumbent U.S. Representative Frederica Wilson in the 2016 election to represent  in the House of Representatives. Wilson defeated Hill.

Personal life
Hill lives in Davie, Florida, with his wife, an internal medicine doctor.

References

1969 births
Living people
Miami Killian Senior High School alumni
American football wide receivers
Miami Hurricanes football players
Miami Dolphins players
Arizona Cardinals players
Phoenix Cardinals players
Players of American football from Miami
New Orleans Saints players
People from Davie, Florida